Frank Moore may refer to:

Writers and artists
 Frank Moore (journalist) (1828–1904), American journalist and compiler
 Frank Moore (performance artist) (1946–2013), American performance artist
 Frank C. Moore (painter) (1953–2002), New York-based painter
 Frank Frankfort Moore (1855–1931), British dramatist, novelist and poet
 Frank Gardner Moore (1865–1955), American Latin scholar
 Frank Montague Moore (1877–1967), painter and the first director of the Honolulu Academy of Arts

Others  
 Frank Moore (American actor) (1880–1924), American stage actor; appeared in His Majesty, the Scarecrow of Oz
 Frank Moore (Canadian actor) (born 1946), Canadian film, television and stage actor
 Frank Moore (baseball) (1877–1964), pitcher in Major League Baseball
 Frank Moore (horse racing), Australian jockey
 Frank Moore (rower), Irish Olympic rower
 Sir Frank Moore (tourism advocate) (born 1930), major figure in tourism development in Australia
 Frank A. Moore (1844–1918), American politician and judge in the state of Oregon
 Frank C. Moore (politician) (1896–1978), American lawyer and politician
 Frank E. Moore (1933–2019), Republican member of the Pennsylvania House of Representatives
 Frank Moore (political activist) (1867–1940), New Zealand political activist
 Frank Murchison Moore, United States Army Air Service officer

See also
 Frank Moore Colby (1865–1925), American educator and writer
 Frank Moore Cross (1921–2012), professor emeritus of the Harvard Divinity School
 Francis Moore (disambiguation)
 Moore (surname)